Stjerneskud is a 1947 Danish comedy film directed by Jon Iversen and Alice O'Fredericks. The film marked the debut of Dirch Passer. Stjerneskud is the Danish word for Meteor.

Cast
Osvald Helmuth   
Einar Sissener   
Betty Helsengreen   
Sigrid Horne-Rasmussen   
Helmuth Larsen   
Stig Lommer  
Henry Nielsen   
Dirch Passer

External links
 

1940s Danish-language films
1947 films
Films directed by Alice O'Fredericks
1947 comedy films
Danish comedy films
Danish black-and-white films